Sonnet 27 is one of 154 sonnets published by William Shakespeare in a quarto titled Shakespeare's Sonnets in 1609. It is a part of the Fair Youth group of sonnets, and the first in a group of five sonnets that portray the poet in solitude and meditating from a distance on the young man.  A theme of the first two of the group (sonnets 27 - 28) regards the night and restlessness, which is a motif also found in the sonnets of Petrarch.

Analysis
In Sonnet 27 the weary poet cannot find rest — not day or night.  He goes to bed weary after working hard, which is the "toil" of line one, and the "travail" of line two. As soon as he lies down, another journey begins in his thoughts ("To work my mind") — the destination is the young man, who is far from where the poet is ("from far where I abide").  The poet's thoughts take that journey, and though he sees nothing but the darkness of night, his imagination presents to him an image of the young man, an image that seems to hang before him in the dark, like a jewel.  This vision makes the "black night" beautiful — the word "black" is equated with ugliness and "night" has a feminine aspect.  The reader is led to expect this vision to improve the poet's lot, but the final couplet suggests that it only adds to the restless misery of the weary poet, and "no quiet" can the poet find.

Structure
Sonnet 27 is an English or Shakespearean sonnet, which consists of three quatrains followed by a final couplet. It follows the rhyme scheme ABAB CDCD EFEF GG, and is written in iambic pentameter, a metre in which each line has five feet, and each foot has two syllables accented weak/strong. Most of the lines are regular iambic pentameter including line three:

 ×   /    ×  /  ×   /  ×   /  ×   / 
But then begins a journey in my head (27.3)
/ = ictus, a metrically strong syllabic position. × = nonictus.

Notes

References
Baldwin, T. W. (1950). On the Literary Genetics of Shakspeare's Sonnets. University of Illinois Press, Urbana.
Hubler, Edwin (1952). The Sense of Shakespeare's Sonnets. Princeton University Press, Princeton.
Schoenfeldt, Michael (2007). The Sonnets: The Cambridge Companion to Shakespeare's Poetry. Patrick Cheney, Cambridge University Press, Cambridge.

External links

Paraphrase and analysis (Shakespeare-online)
Analysis

British poems
Sonnets by William Shakespeare